Al-Amin al-Thaniyah is a neighborhood in New Baghdad, a district on the east side of Baghdad.

It was named after the Caliph al-Amin. In 2003, Shiites renamed it to "Al-Murthadha District", after Ali Murthadha, the first Shiite imam.

The controversial airstrikes on July 12, 2007, by a US army attack helicopter, which killed a number of civilians, among them two Reuters news staff, took place here.

Variant transliterations into English
"al-Amin"/"Amin"/"Ameen"
"Thanniyah" can also be spelled "Thania" or "Thanya".

References

Amin Al Thaniyah